Maras District is one of seven districts of the Urubamba Province in Peru.

Geography 
Other mountains are  Sullu Qaqa and Wayna Urqu.

Ethnic groups 
The people in the district are mainly indigenous citizens of Quechua descent. Quechua is the language which the majority of the population (79.29%) learnt to speak in childhood, 20.42% of the residents started speaking using the Spanish language (2007 Peru Census).

References

External links
 Official municipal website